Bhubon Pegu is a Bharatiya Janata Party politician from the Indian state of Assam. He was elected in Assam Legislative Assembly election in 2006 and 2016 from Jonai constituency. In 2020, He joined BJP.

References 

Living people
People from Lakhimpur district
Assam MLAs 2006–2011
Assam MLAs 2016–2021
Year of birth missing (living people)
Assam MLAs 2021–2026